Selinus or Selinous was an ancient town on the Sporadic island of Peparethus (modern Skopelos). 

Its site is located near Klima.

References

Populated places in the ancient Aegean islands
Former populated places in Greece
Skopelos